On 20 January 2022 the International Committee of the Red Cross made an appeal to hackers who had stolen private data, saying they would speak "directly and confidentially" to those responsible for the attack. The hackers had stolen private data on more than 515,000 vulnerable people from at least 60 Red Cross and Red Crescent societies. So far there is no proof that the data has been leaked, but the ICRC said that their gravest concern was the risk posed by exposing the data.

The attack was aimed at a Swiss contractor that stores the data.

The perpetrators have not been identified.

Impact
The ICRC has suspended access to compromised computer systems which are part of the Restoring Family Links programme, which was targeted in the attack. A spokesman said "We will do our utmost to ensure some business continuity and a resumption of services as soon as possible".

References

External links
Sophisticated cyber-attack targets Red Cross Red Crescent data on 500,000 people - www.icrc.org
Cyberattack on International Committee of the Red Cross - www.redcross.org

2022 in computing
Cyberattacks
Data breaches
Cyberattack
January 2022 crimes